The game canon is a list of video games to be considered for preservation by the Library of Congress. The New York Times called the creation of this list "an assertion that digital games have a cultural significance and a historical significance". Game canon is modeled on the efforts of the National Film Preservation Board, which produces an annual list of films that are subsequently added to the National Film Registry, which is managed by the Library of Congress. The game canon committee comprises Henry Lowood, game designers Warren Spector and Steve Meretzky, Matteo Bittanti, and Joystiq journalist Christopher Grant.

History
The game canon project was started by Henry Lowood, curator of the History of Science and Technology Collections at Stanford University. He started to preserve video games and video-game artifacts in 1998, and in the years following, he has noted that video games are something worthy of preserving. Henry Lowood submitted the proposal to the Library of Congress in September 2006, and during the 2007 Game Developers Conference, he announced the game canon.

In September 2012 the Library of Congress had already 3,000 games from many platforms and also around 1,500 strategy guides.

List of games considered
The initial list consists of 10 video games that are each considered representing the beginning of a genre that is still vital in the video game industry.
 Spacewar!
 Star Raiders
 Zork
 Tetris
 SimCity
 Super Mario Bros. 3
 Civilization I/II
 Doom
 Warcraft series
 Sensible World of Soccer

See also 
 Video games as art

References

External links
 News report from the New York Times
 News report from Joystiq

Video game culture
History of video games
Library of Congress